AKS University (Amicable Knowledge Solution) is a private university in Satna, Madhya Pradesh, India. It is the one of the private universities in the region of Vindhya and Mahakoshal. It was established under M.P Legislature Act No.44 duly recognized under section 2(f) passed on 23 November 2011.  AKS University is an initiative of the Rajiv Gandhi Group of Institutions.

References

External links

Satna
Universities in Madhya Pradesh
Educational institutions established in 2011
2011 establishments in Madhya Pradesh
Private universities in India